Tatjana Mittermayer (born 26 July 1964 in Rosenheim, Bavaria) is a German freestyle skier and Olympic medalist. She won the silver medal at the 1998 Winter Olympics in Nagano, in moguls.

She participated at the 1988 Winter Olympics moguls (demonstration event), where she finished 1st. 
She participated at the 1992 Winter Olympics, finishing 4th, and at the 1994 Winter Olympics, finishing 6th.

References

1964 births
Living people
Freestyle skiers at the 1992 Winter Olympics
Freestyle skiers at the 1994 Winter Olympics
Freestyle skiers at the 1998 Winter Olympics
Olympic silver medalists for Germany
Olympic medalists in freestyle skiing
Medalists at the 1998 Winter Olympics
German female freestyle skiers
People from Rosenheim
Sportspeople from Upper Bavaria
Olympic freestyle skiers of Germany